Laliostominae is a subfamily of frogs in the family Mantellidae. It contains two genera and a total of seven species. These frogs are native to Madagascar.

Genera
There are two recognized genera:
 Aglyptodactylus Boulenger, 1919 (6 species)
 Laliostoma Glaw, Vences & Böhme, 1998 (monotypic)

References

Mantellidae
Amphibian subfamilies
Taxa named by Frank Glaw
Taxa named by Miguel Vences